Zagajica is a village in the Vršac municipality of the South Banat District in Vojvodina province, Serbia. It is 53.4 miles from Belgrade, at the coordinates 44.97806 N 21.22444 E. At the 2011 census its population was 492, with a Serb ethnic majority of 89.21%.

Etymology

In Serbian, the village is known as Zagajica (Загајица), in Hungarian as Fürjes, and in Croatian as Zagajica. The nearby Zagajička Brda (Zagajica Hills) are named for it.

Historical population

1961: 1,214
1971: 1,055
1981: 928
1991: 790
2002: 575
2011: 492

See also
List of places in Serbia
List of cities, towns and villages in Vojvodina

References
Slobodan Ćurčić, Broj stanovnika Vojvodine, Novi Sad, 1996.

External links
Zagajica
Zagajica - Travelpost

Populated places in Serbian Banat
Populated places in South Banat District
Vršac